Émile Colinus (born 1884 in Paris, died 1966 in Paris), was a French painter and illustrator .

Biography 
Colinus first studied at the Académie de Montmartre under the leadership of André Lhote, with whom he learned how to simplify forms. The paintings he shows at the Salon des Indépendants from 1925 synthesize the heritage of Fernand Cormon and André Lhote in a personal way.

Colinus married Renée Unik, who was a painter as well. Having studied with Jules Adler and Georges Berges at the Académie Julian she was a specialist of portrait paintings. The couple didn't travel far but in 1931 they went to the shore of the Mediterranean where Colinus painted a landscape that he would later exhibit at the Salon des Indépendants the same year. In 1956 Colinus spent all summer in Martel, Lot, in a villa with a garden where he painted a portrait of his wife seated behind her easel.

He died in Paris on 18 August 1966.

Works in public institutions 
 Museum of Martel (Lot)

References

 Gérald Schurr, 1820-1920, Les petits maîtres de la peinture, valeur de demain, Paris, 1972, p. 138.

External links 
French Naturalist Painters 1890-1950 exhibition - 29 January - 16 February 2013, Galerie de l'Association des Amis de Gustave de Beaumont, Geneva

1884 births
1966 deaths
French illustrators
20th-century French painters
20th-century French male artists
French male painters
Painters from Paris